The Samsung SPH-M300 is a flip or clamshell style cell phone introduced in mid-2007 as a basic, low cost camera phone with limited multimedia capability for the North American market. The SPH-M300 is a personal digital assistant (PDA - as designated by the SPH model prefix) style handset with basic contact directory, notes, calendar, and other typical PDA functions and is also capable of rudimentary Web browsing, and SMS text messaging although it does not have a dedicated text keyboard.

References

External links
Samsung website product details

M300
Mobile phones introduced in 2007